Markowitz may refer to:

People
 Deborah Markowitz, Vermont secretary of state
 Gerald Markowitz, American historian
 Harry Markowitz, a financial economist and Nobel Laureate
 John Markowitz, professor of psychiatry at Weill Cornell Medical College
 Kate Markowitz, American singer-songwriter
 Marty Markowitz, Brooklyn borough president
 Mitch Markowitz, Canadian television executive
 Nicholas Markowitz (1984-2000), American murder victim 
 Phil Markowitz, a pianist
 William Markowitz, American astronomer

Other uses
 The Family Markowitz, 1996 novel

Jewish surnames